= Colombo Tamil =

Colombo Tamil may refer to:

- Sri Lankan Tamils, of Colombo, Sri Lanka
- Colombo Tamil dialect, dialect of Colombo Tamil people
